The East Regional League (currently named the BT East League for sponsorship reasons) is one of three Scottish Regional Leagues operated by the Scottish Rugby Union, which play at a level below that of the Scottish National Leagues structure.  Originally, these divisions were district leagues under the jurisdiction of the Edinburgh & District Union and the Scottish Borders Union.

Winners of the top division progress to Scottish National League Division Three.

East Regional League, 2021–22

See also
Caledonia Regional Leagues
West Regional Leagues

References

Scottish Regional League (rugby union)
6
Sports leagues established in 1973
1973 establishments in Scotland